Straughn, also known as Haygood, is an unincorporated community in Covington County, Alabama, United States.

History
The community was originally called Haygood, but the name was later changed to Straughn in honor of a local family who was instrumental in establishing the community's school. A post office operated under the name Haygood from 1892 to 1904. Straughn is home to Straughn High School.

References

Unincorporated communities in Covington County, Alabama
Unincorporated communities in Alabama